Leventis United was a football team based in Ibadan, Nigeria. It was founded in 1982 as an amalgam of clubs from Oyo State, backed by the Royal Nigeria Carpet company; a subsidiary of Greek corporation Leventis.

Leventis won the third division in 1984, the same year they won the FA Cup. The next year, Leventis was promoted to the First Division after winning the second division with an undefeated record, the first such feat in Nigerian football. With John Mastoroudes as general manager, the team quickly built itself into one of the best financed sides in the country.
However, the club suffered with the recession and coups of the late 1980s.
Due to the lack of financial backing from the Leventis Company, the team disbanded after the 1987 league season.
After twenty years, there is a grassroots effort underway to resurrect the team.

Achievements
 Nigerian Premier League: 1
1986. (third straight title in 3 different divisions).

 Nigerian FA Cup: 2
1984, 1986.

Nigerian Super Cup: 1
1984.

Performance in CAF competitions
 African Cup Winners' Cup:
1985: Runners-up

 African Cup of Champions Clubs:
1987: Quarterfinals

External links
 Mastoroudes prays for Amodu’s success
 We must stop the Mafia, says John Mastoroudes
 Masteroudes Re-assembles Leventis United

Football clubs in Ibadan
Defunct football clubs in Nigeria
Association football clubs disestablished in 1987
1982 establishments in Nigeria
1987 disestablishments in Nigeria
Association football clubs established in 1982